Tony Bua (born February 11, 1980) is a former American football linebacker. His hometown is Liberty, Texas.

College career
Bua had a distinguished college career as a linebacker/safety while playing at the University of Arkansas, and entered the draft with Mark Bloom as his agent. Although Bua was drafted as a linebacker, he mainly was used to play on special teams, primarily during punting situations.

Professional career

NFL career
Bua was drafted in the 5th round of the 2004 NFL Draft by the Miami Dolphins. During preseason workouts, Bua was praised by Dolphins head coach Dave Wannstedt for his work ethic and performance, and was stated to have a chance to make the roster. During the season, Bua missed a 4-week stretch in the early part of the season due to a hamstring injury, and then on Week 11 during a game with the Seattle Seahawks, he injured his quadriceps and was placed on the injured reserve. He played a total of seven regular season games for the Dolphins.

While Bua was moved to safety to begin the 2005 season, Dolphins waived him on September 4. He was later signed as a free agent, but he was waived again on October 19. He was then signed by the Cincinnati Bengals, but on August 20, 2006, he again was waived. Bua reportedly worked out with the Minnesota Vikings, but was never signed.

CFL
Bua played four games for the Stampeders, but was released during the season.

AAFL
Bua signed to play in the AAFL in its inaugural season, for Team Arkansas.

References

External links
Calgary Stampeders bio page

1980 births
Living people
Players of American football from New Orleans
American football safeties
Arkansas Razorbacks football players
Miami Dolphins players
Calgary Stampeders players